ARM Usumacinta may refer to one of the following vessels of the Mexican Navy named for the Usumacinta River:

 , the former American  USS Don O. Woods (APD-118), launched February 1944; acquired by the Mexican Navy, December 1963; renamed Miguel Hidalgo after Miguel Hidalgo y Costilla, 1994; reverted to name of Usumacinta; stricken July 2001
 , the former American  USS Frederick (LST-1184), launched March 1969; acquired by the Mexican Navy, November 2002; in active service

Mexican Navy ship names